Felipe Codallos (1790 – 1849) was a Central American general and politician. From 7 May 1823 to 25 May 1823, he was the political chief of the State of El Salvador within the Federal Republic of Central America, governing as military chief.

Codallos was captain general of the province of Guatemala from 22 November 1822 to 7 March 1823, under the Mexican Empire of Agustín de Iturbide. When Mexican General Vicente Filísola, who was in charge of enforcing Mexican authority in Central America, returned to Mexico, he named his second-in-charge, Codallos, military chief of El Salvador.

On 25 May 1823, the city government of San Salvador rebelled and required Codallos and his 500 Mexican and Guatemalan soldiers to evacuate the city. The Consultive Junta then took power, led by Colonel José Rivas. On 1 July 1823, El Salvador, along with the rest of Central America, declared independence from the Mexican Empire.

External links
 Brief biography

19th-century politicians
Presidents of El Salvador
1790 births
1849 deaths